Rajupalem is a village in Prakasam district of Andhra Pradesh in India. It belongs to Ballikurava, Martur mandals and is inhabited by approximately 5371 people.

Geography

The interesting fact about this Village is that, though the village had one Geographical location it is divided into two different constitutions as Addanki for K.Rajupalem and Parchuru for Rajupalem by the road passing through the village.

K. Rajupalem (Konidena Rajupalem) belongs to Ballikurava Mandal and Rajupalem is in Martur Mandal in Prakasam District of Andhra Pradesh State, India. It belongs to Coastal Andhra region. (Herein after the both villages are termed as Rajupalem and the data represents the both villages)

It is located 63 kn to the north from the district headquarters Ongole. It is surrounded by Martur Mandal, Yaddanapudi Mandal, and Chilakaluripet Mandal to the east; and Santhamaguluru Mandal to the north. Chilakaluripet, Narasaraopet, Vinukonda, Chirala are the nearby cities. This place is on the border of Prakasam District and Guntur District.

Demographics
Around 1,440 families reside in this village. As per constitution of India and Panchyati Raaj Act, K. Rajupalem village is administered by the Sarpanch Sri. Gadde MuralidharaRao elected for the five years term. As per the Census India 2011, Rajupalem village ( Sum of the both for K. Rajupalem, Rajupalem ) had a population of 5,371, of whom 2,690 were males and 2,681 were females. The population of children between age 0-6 was 554 which is 10.31% of total population.

The female sex ratio of Rajupalem village is around 997 per 1000 male, compared with the average of Andhra Pradesh state which is 993. The literacy rate of K. Rajupalem village is 53.88% out of whom 62.38% males are literate and 45.36% females are literate. There are 22.47% Scheduled Caste (SC) and 3% Scheduled Tribe (ST) of total population in Rajupalem village.

Population facts

Climate

Hot summers and cool winters are observed due to its proximity to the coast of the Bay of Bengal. It receives both Southwest monsoon and Northeast monsoon. It is most affected by the cyclonic storms that occur on the east coast.

References

Villages in Prakasam district
Mandal headquarters in Prakasam district